Imperial Life in the Emerald City: Inside Iraq's Green Zone  is a 2006 book by Rajiv Chandrasekaran.

Synopsis
Imperial Life in the Emerald City takes a critical look at the civilian leadership of the American reconstruction project in Iraq. Centered mainly on the actions of the Coalition Provisional Authority, within the Green Zone of Baghdad, it details events from the end of the invasion phase of the war until the official transfer of power to Iraqis and the growing insurgency in the country.

In the book's prologue, Chandrasekaran states that his work does not take a side for or against the United States' invasion of Iraq, simply treating events as given, and instead focuses on examining the handling of the post-invasion occupation.

Awards
 Winner 2007 Samuel Johnson Prize for Non-Fiction and the 2006 Cornelius Ryan Award, and was shortlisted for the Guardian First Book Award
 One of the best non-fiction books of 2006/2007 by Entertainment Weekly, New York Times and  Los Angeles Times

Film adaptation 

The nonfiction book has been adapted into a fictional thriller written by Brian Helgeland and directed by Paul Greengrass.  The film stars Matt Damon, Amy Ryan, and Greg Kinnear.

References

External links
Official Site
Online chat with the author
Review by The New York Times
C-SPAN Q&A interview with Chandrasekaran on Imperial Life in the Emerald City, September 24, 2006

2006 non-fiction books
Iraq War books
Alfred A. Knopf books
Coalition Provisional Authority